Stipona is a village in the northwestern part of the Resen Municipality of the Republic of North Macedonia, near the mountain of Galičica. The village is under  from the municipal centre of Resen. The village is deserted.

Demographics
The last census in which Stipona still had permanent residents was in 1981.

References

Villages in Resen Municipality